Super Junior (Syupeo Junieo) is a South Korean boy band. Formed in 2005 by producer Lee Soo-man of S.M. Entertainment, the group comprised a total of thirteen members at its peak. Super Junior originally debuted with twelve members, consisting of leader Leeteuk, Heechul, Hangeng, Yesung, Kangin, Shindong, Sungmin, Eunhyuk, Siwon, Donghae, Ryeowook and Kibum. Kyuhyun joined the group in 2006.

Main tours

 Between Super Show 3 stops, the group took part in the SMTown Live '10 World Tour and toured in Los Angeles, Paris, Tokyo and New York City along with other SM Entertainment-managed artists, performing outside of Asia for the first time. Super Junior's performances were well received by the media,

Subgroup tours
Super Junior-K.R.Y.
 Super Junior-K.R.Y. The 1st Concert (2010–11)
 Super Junior-K.R.Y. Special Winter Concert (2012–13)
 Super Junior-K.R.Y. Japan Tour (2015)
 Super Junior-K.R.Y. Asia Tour (2015)
Super Junior-D&E
Super Junior D&E The 1st Japan Tour (2014)
 Super Junior D&E The 2nd Japan Tour (2015)
Super Junior-D&E Japan Tour 2018 ~Style~ (2018)
Super Junior D&E The 1st Asia Tour (2015)
The D&E (2019)

Fan meeting tours

See also
 Yesung#Concert and tours
 Kim Ryeo-wook#Concert
 Cho Kyuhyun#Concert and tours

References

 
Lists of concert tours
Lists of concert tours of South Korean artists
Lists of events in South Korea
South Korean music-related lists
K-pop concerts by artist